Sigmund Neuberger (or Sigmund Newburger) (25 February 1871 – 9 May 1911), who performed as an illusionist under the stage name The Great Lafayette, was the highest-paid magician of his time.

Early life and career
Neuberger was born in Munich, and emigrated to the United States in 1884. At the age of 19, he began performing in vaudeville-style entertainment, and later began his career as a conjuror as an impersonator of the magician Ching Ling Foo. He adopted the name "The Great Lafayette", and made his first appearance in England in 1892.

His excellent quick-change routines, as well as dramatic illusions, such as his own "Lion's Bride" and "Dr. Kremer–Vivisectionist" illusions, made him very popular with audiences. He became one of the highest-paid performers in vaudeville, earning £44,000 a year (about £3.6 million in 2014 prices). By 1900, he was able to tour with a company of 40 performers, together with his magic show and a menagerie including a lion, for use in his illusions.

Theatre fire
Early in 1911, he began a tour of Britain. The pampered object of the Great Lafayette's affection was his dog Beauty, a perky terrier given to him as a pup by fellow conjurer and admirer Harry Houdini. Beauty had her own suite of brocaded rooms, ate five-course meals, and wore a diamond-studded collar. Beauty died four days before the opening of a show at the Empire Palace Theatre in Edinburgh. After initial resistance from Edinburgh City Council, Neuberger arranged for the dog to be buried in Piershill Cemetery. The Council agreed to provide a plot on the condition that Lafayette himself would be buried there upon his own death.

Four days later, in a freak accident, Lafayette was performing his signature illusion "The Lion's Bride", when a lantern set fire to the set, which went up in flames within minutes. The audience, thinking that this was all part of the illusion, did not evacuate until the theatre manager signalled for the orchestra to play God Save the King. Many of the company, however, were trapped on stage when the safety curtain was lowered and jammed, leaving only a small gap at the bottom, through which a strong draught of air fanned the flames into an inferno. Lafayette himself had ensured that the side-doors to the stage had been secured, to exclude unwanted interlopers and prevent the lion's escape.

Lafayette escaped but returned in a vain attempt to rescue his horse. He became trapped in the burning building and perished. Ten of his fellow players from the company were also killed in the fire. The theatre burned to the ground. The body of Lafayette was apparently soon found and sent to Glasgow for cremation. Two days after the fire, however, workers clearing the understage area found another body identically dressed as Lafayette. It transpired that the body at the crematorium was that of the illusionist's body double. On 14 May the urn containing the Great Lafayette's ashes was taken through Edinburgh, witnessed by a crowd estimated to number over 250,000, before being laid to rest in the paws of his beloved (and by then, stuffed) Beauty, at Piershill Cemetery.

Legacy
In May 2011 Edinburgh Festival Theatre, built on the site of the Empire Palace, hosted the "Great Lafayette Festival", featuring magician Paul Daniels, to commemorate the hundredth anniversary of Neuberger's death. The event included, on 9 May, a live webcast séance held by the "Edinburgh Secret Society", led by co-founders Professor Richard Wiseman and Dr. Peter Lamont.

References

Further reading
 Robertson, Ian and Rutter, Gordon (2011) The Death and Life of The Great Lafayette, New Lands Press, 
 Setterington, Arthur (1991), The Life and Times of the Great Lafayette, (illustrated: Scott McLelland), Abracadabra Show Productions, Inc., Abraxas Publications. .

External links
 Parting Glances: Beauty & The Great Lafayette
 Funeral of the Great Lafayette at Edinburgh, May 14, 1911 Scottish Screen Archive, National Library of Scotland
 Aftermath of the fire at the Empire Palace Theatre, with the charred remains of Lafayette's Lion Scottish Screen Archive, National Library of Scotland
 Images connected to the Empire Theatre Fire and The Great Lafayette's performance there Capital Collections - Edinburgh Library

People from Munich
German magicians
American magicians
1872 births
1911 deaths
Vaudeville performers
Accidental deaths in Scotland
Deaths from fire
German emigrants to the United States